Md Sohorab Hossain is a retired Bangladeshi Civil Servant and currently serving as the Chairperson of the Bangladesh Public Service Commission. He is a former Senior Secretary of the Ministry of Education.

Early life 
Hossain was born in 1961 in Chatkhil Upazila, Noakhali District, East Pakistan, Pakistan. He completed his bachelor's degree and masters in Bengali language and literature from the University of Dhaka.

Career 
Hossain joined the admin cadre of Bangladesh Civil Service in 1984 and after training started working as an Assistant Commissioner in 1986. He took Military Orientation Training Course at Bangladesh Military Academy in Bhatiary.

Hossain was appointed the Secretary of the Secondary and Higher Education Division on 6 December 2016.

In May 2018, Hossain chaired a meeting of the National Curriculum Coordination Committee.

He later served as the Secretary at the Ministry of Education and retired on 31 December 2019.

Hossain served as the Bangladesh Civil Service (Admin) Academy as its rector.

In September 2020, Hossain was appointed the Chairperson of the Bangladesh Public Service Commission for a five-year term. He replaced Mohammad Sadique as Chairperson of the Bangladesh Public Service Commission.

In February 2022, Hossain served as a member of the Election Commission Search Committee.

Personal life 
Hossain is married to Dr. Mahmuda Yasmin, a professor of the University of Dhaka. The couple is blessed with a daughter.

References 

Living people
Bangladeshi civil servants
University of Dhaka alumni
1961 births
People from Noakhali District